Intoxicated may refer to:
The adjective related to Intoxication
"Intoxicated" (Hinder song), 2015 single
"Intoxicated", song on Symphony Soldier album by The Cab
"Intoxicated", 2007 single by Amanda Wilson
"Intoxicated" (Martin Solveig and GTA song), 2015 single
Intoxicated (album), a 2003 album by German recording artist Gracia
"Intoxicated", a song by Lacuna Coil on the album Dark Adrenaline

See also
 Intoxication (disambiguation)